Jim Krohn (born 1957) is a former American football and Canadian football quarterback in the Canadian Football League and USFL who played for the Winnipeg Blue Bombers and Philadelphia Stars. He played college football for the Arizona Wildcats.

References

1957 births
Living people
American football quarterbacks
Winnipeg Blue Bombers players
Arizona Wildcats football players
Canadian football quarterbacks